Otranto is a city in Italy.

Otranto may also refer to:
HMS Otranto
Otranto Township, Mitchell County, Iowa, USA
The Castle of Otranto by Horace Walpole
Castle of Otranto (film)